Thermodesulfobium narugense is a sulfate-reducing, strictly anaerobic and moderate thermophilic bacterium from the genus of Thermodesulfobium which has been isolated from a hot spring from Miyagi Prefecture in Japan. This microorganism is nonmotile, rod-shaped, Gram-negative and non-spore-forming.

References

 

Thermoanaerobacterales
Bacteria described in 2004
Thermophiles
Anaerobes